Nikolai Ignatyevich Muzil (Николай Игнатьевич Музиль (26 November 1839, Chesmeny, Moscow, Russian Empire, - 9 July 1906, Moscow) was a prominent Russian 19th century stage actor, associated with Moscow's Maly Theatre. He was honoured with the Meritorious Artists of the Imperial Theatres title in 1903.

Biography 
Born to Ignaty Muzil, a well-established Russian merchant of Czech origins, Nikolai Muzil made his debut at the Maly Theatre in 1865 and stayed with it for the rest of his life. Of his twenty parts in Alexander Ostrovsky's plays (ten of which came in productions given to him as benefits by the author), most lauded (by Konstantin Stanislavski, among others) were those of Gavrila (An Ardent Heart, 1869), Pyotr (The Forest, 1871), Narokov (Talents and Admirers, 1881) and  Shmaga (Guilty Without Fault, 1884). The foremost comic actor of Russian theatre of the time, Muzil was praised as  master psychologist who imparted his characters with unique vitality and authenticity.

Nikolai Muzil is also renowned as a founder of a vast artistic dynasty: his wife Varvara Muzil-Borozdina (1853-1927), daughters Varvara Ryzhova (1871-1963), Nadezhda Muzil-Borozdina (1880-1952) and Elena Muzil (1871-1961 ), Nikolai Muzil (son), Nikolai Ryzhov (1900-1986, grandson) and Tatyana Ryzhova (1941-2012, grand-granddaughter), were all Maly Theatre actors and actresses.

References 

Male actors from Moscow
1839 births
1906 deaths